Color blindness is a term that has been used by justices of the United States Supreme Court in several opinions relating to racial equality and social equity, particularly in public education. The term metaphorically references the medical phenomenon of color blindness.

A color-blind racial ideology can be defined as holding the belief that an individual's race or ethnicity should not influence how that individual is treated in society. This is further divided into two dimensions, color evasion and power evasion. Color evasion is the belief that people should not be treated differently on the basis of their color, while power evasion posits that systemic advantage based on color should have no influence on what people can accomplish, and accomplishments are instead based solely on one's own work performance.

At various times in U.S. history, individuals and groups have used this term to signal a desired or allegedly achieved state of freedom from racial prejudice or a desire that policies and laws should not explicitly consider race. It has sometimes been asserted that policies that differentiate by racial classification could tend to create, perpetuate or exacerbate racial divisiveness.

Sociologists and historians have disputed the validity of claims that racial equality has been achieved.

In U.S. Supreme Court opinions 
In his dissenting opinion to Plessy v. Ferguson (1896), Justice John Marshall Harlan wrote that "Our Constitution is color-blind, and neither knows nor tolerates classes among citizens. In respect of civil rights, all citizens are equal before the law. The humblest is the peer of the most powerful. The law regards man as man, and takes no account of his surroundings or of his color when his civil rights as guaranteed by the supreme law of the land are involved." His opinion could thus be interpreted as saying that laws should not differentiate between people of different races. His opinion was not the majority-supported decision, which at the time was that laws requiring racial segregation were allowable, establishing the idea that "separate but equal" treatment was constitutionally acceptable.

More recently, the term color blind has appeared in United States Supreme Court opinions involving affirmative action, in opinions that support consideration of race when evaluating laws and their effects:
 In a concurring opinion of Regents v. Bakke (1978), Justices William J. Brennan Jr., Byron White, Thurgood Marshall, and Harry Blackmun objected to the color blind term, writing that "we cannot ... let color blindness become myopia which masks the reality that many 'created equal' have been treated within our lifetimes as inferior both by the law and by their fellow citizens."
In her dissenting opinion to Gratz v. Bollinger (2003), Justice Ruth Bader Ginsburg quoted from a 1966 5th Circuit decision: The Constitution is both color blind and color conscious. To avoid conflict with the equal protection clause, a classification that denies a benefit, causes harm, or imposes a burden must not be based on race. In that sense, the Constitution is color blind. But the Constitution is color conscious to prevent discrimination being perpetuated and to undo the effects of past discrimination.
In his concurring opinion to PICS v. Seattle (2007), Justice Clarence Thomas wrote that "the color-blind Constitution does not bar the government from taking measures to remedy past state-sponsored discrimination indeed, it requires that such measures be taken in certain circumstances."

In sociology

A color-blind society, in sociology, is one in which racial classification does not affect a person's socially created opportunities. Such a society would be free from differential legal or social treatment based on race or color. A color-blind society would have race-neutral governmental policies and would reject racial discrimination in any form.

Racial or color blindness reflects an ideal in the society in which skin color is insignificant. The ideal was most articulated "along with the emergence of the Civil Rights Movement in the US and anti-racist movements abroad". Color-blind ideology is based on tenets of non-discrimination, due process of law, equal protection under the law, and equal opportunities regardless of race, ideas which have strongly influenced Western liberalism in the post-World War II period.

Proponents of "color-blind" practices believe that treating people equally as individuals leads to a more equal society or that racism and race privilege no longer exercise the power they once did, rendering the need for policies such as race-based affirmative action obsolete.

Support

Professor William Julius Wilson of Harvard University has argued that "class was becoming more important than race" in determining life prospects within the black community. 
Wilson has published several works including The Declining Significance of Race (1978) and The Truly Dis-advantaged (1987) explaining his views on black poverty and racial inequality. He believes that affirmative action primarily benefits the most privileged individuals within the black community. This is because strictly race-based programs disregard a candidate's socioeconomic background and therefore fail to help the poorer portion of the black community that actually needs the assistance. In a society where millions of blacks live in the middle and upper classes and millions of whites live in poverty, race is no longer an accurate indication of privilege. Recognizing someone's social class is more important than recognizing someone's race, indicating that society should be class-conscious, not race-conscious.

Martin Luther King Jr. in his 1963 "I Have a Dream" Speech proclaimed, "I have a dream that my four little children will one day live in a nation where they will not be judged by the color of their skin but by the content of their character." This statement has been interpreted by some as an example of color-blind racial ideology. Roger Clegg, the conservative President of the Center for Equal Opportunity, felt that this quotation supported the idea that race-conscious and equal opportunity should not exist, as he believes people should not be treated differently based on the color of their skin. Conversely, American author Michael Eric Dyson felt that Dr. King only believed in the possibility of a color-blind society under the condition that racism and oppression were ultimately destroyed.

Supreme Court Justice Clarence Thomas supports color-blind policies. He believes the Equal Protection Clause of the Fourteenth Amendment forbids consideration of race, such as race-based affirmative action or preferential treatment. He believes that race-oriented programs create "a cult of victimization" and imply blacks require "special treatment in order to succeed".

When defending new voting rights bills in 2020, Republican Texas legislators claimed that since the process they wanted to establish for voter registration did not involve different processes for people of different races and did not involve collecting information about race or ethnicity, their new requirements for eligibility to vote were "color blind" and should not be considered racially discriminatory.

Among conservative presidents, color blindness as an idea has increased in the late 20th and 21st centuries.

Criticism

In 1997, Leslie G. Carr published Color-Blind Racism which reviewed the history of racist ideologies in America. He saw "color-blindness" as an ideology that undercuts the legal and political foundation of integration and affirmative action. In another book that supports some of Carr's arguments, Privilege Revealed: How Invisible Preference Undermines America, Stephanie M. Wildman writes that many Americans who advocate a merit-based, race-free worldview do not acknowledge the systems of privilege which benefit them. For example, many Americans rely on a social and sometimes even financial inheritance from previous generations. She argues that this inheritance is unlikely to be forthcoming if one's ancestors were slaves, and privileges "whiteness", "maleness", and heterosexuality.

Sociologist Eduardo Bonilla-Silva writes that majority groups use color-blindness as a means of avoiding the discussion of racism and discrimination. Color-blindness can be seen as a way to undermine the hardships of minority groups, as it used to argue that the United States is a meritocracy, in which people succeed only because they work hard and not because of their privilege. Critics of this claim point to statistics that contradict this notion of meritocracy, for example, the average black or Hispanic household earning more than $75,000 still live in a less affluent, resource-rich neighborhood than a white household that earns less than $40,000. In addition to this systematic racial oppression, minority groups are further pushed down financially. As Glenn Ellis, a health advocacy communication specialist and author, said, children that live in poverty have scary numbers to face: "25 percent more likely to drop out of school; 40 percent more likely to become a teen parent; 50 percent more likely to be placed in special education; 60 percent more likely never to attend college; 70 percent more likely to be arrested for a violent crime; and 30 percent of poor children score very low on early reading skills, compared to only 7 percent of children from moderate- or high-income families."

Amy Ansell of Bard College argues that color-blindness operates under the assumption that we are living in a world that is "post-race", where race no longer matters. While the ideal that race should never be a point of consideration may be seen as desirable, the critique is that if this were true then race would not be taken into consideration even when trying to address inequality or remedy past wrongs.

Abstract liberalism "abstracts and decontextualizes" themes from political and economic liberalism, such as meritocracy and the free market, to argue against the strong presence of racism. It is also often used in discussions of affirmative action. The principle of laissez-faire emphasizes a "hands off" policy in terms of the government's involvement with economic activity. When applied to issues of race, it results in people being for equality in principle but against government action to implement equality, a policy often called laissez-faire racism.

The "biologization of culture" explains the inequality among race today in terms of cultural difference. Where disparities were once explained in terms of biology, they are now being discussed in terms of culture. "Culture" in this framework is seen as something fixed and hard to change. One example form of rhetoric used in this framework is the argument, "if Irish, Jews (or other ethnic groups) have 'made it', how come blacks have not?" Such rhetoric blames blacks and other minority groups for their own situations because other previously disadvantaged groups have managed to 'make it' in American society.

Robert D. Reason and Nancy J. Evans outline a similar description of color-blindness by Professor T.A. Forman of Emory University, which is based on four beliefs: 1. racial groups receive merit-based privileges, 2. most people do not notice nor are they concerned about race, 3. social inequality today is due to "cultural deficits" of individual people or racial or ethnic groups, and 4. given the previous three assumptions, there is no need to pay "systematic attention" to any current inequities. They argue the prevalence of color-blindness is partially attributed to lack of knowledge or lack of exposure. Due to racial segregation that exists in housing and education, many Americans may not have direct contact with the discrimination that still exists.

In Social Inequality and Social Stratification in US Society, Christopher Doob writes that "color-blind racism" represents  "whites' assertion that they are living in a world where racial privilege no longer exists, but their behavior 'supports' racialized structures and practices".

Bonilla-Silva has described four "frames" that he says guide color-blind racism. According to Bonilla-Silva, abstract liberalism is the most important of these frames and forms the foundation of color-blind ideology. This involves invoking abstract ideas such as "equal opportunity" and "individual choice" while opposing concrete proposals to reduce inequality. This perspective tends to ignore the under-representation of people of color in prestigious jobs and schools, along with institutional practices that encourage segregation. Bonilla-Silva describes naturalization as a frame that portrays racial segregation (including self-segregation) as a natural outcome of individuals' choices, and "just the way things are". For example, using this framework one would say it is simply natural that people of the same race would tend to live together, that it's "just the way it is". Critics argue, however, that this viewpoint ignores the possibility of other factors underlying residential segregation such as the attitude of realtors, bankers, and sellers. Cultural racism relies on cultural, rather than biological, explanations such as "blacks have too many babies" to account for "racial" inequality. A fourth frame is minimization of racism. Within this frame, modern occurrences of racism are seen as rare aberrations committed by the last few racists in society. Because racism is viewed as no longer a problem under this belief, people who subscribe to color-blindness see government programs targeting race as "illegitimate" and no longer necessary.

Eberhardt, Davies, Purdie-Vaughns, and Johnson studied implicit racial biases, supporting research that the amygdala reacts differently to faces of members of our own racial group as compared to members of other racial groups. Their study found that the more stereotypically Black a defendant looked when on trial for murder, the more likely that person was to face a death sentence. More specifically, these race-based disparities were only found to exist in cases in which the victim was white.This outcome is relevant to racial color blindness as it suggests that a society that claims to not see race is not free from the effects of implicit racist biases, and therefore suggests that a color blind approach to issues of race may not actually be possible.

Research

Fryer et al. showed that color-blind affirmative action is about as efficient as race-conscious affirmative action in the short run, but is less profitable in the long term.

In 2010, Apfelbaum et al. exposed elementary school students to color-blind ideology and found that those students were less likely to detect or report instances of overt racial discrimination. The authors concluded "Color-blind messages may thus appear to function effectively on the surface even as they allow explicit forms of bias to persist."

Amy Ansell, a sociologist at Bard College, has compared and contrasted the development of the color-blindness in the United States and South Africa. Given that whites are a minority population in South Africa and a majority population in the United States, Ansell expected to see a significant difference in the manifestation of color-blindness in both countries. The thirty-year time difference between the departure from Jim Crow and cessation of apartheid and differences in racial stratification and levels of poverty also led Ansell to expect a clear difference between the colorblindness ideology in the United States and South Africa. However, she concludes that while color-blindness stems from two very different origins in the two countries, the current structure of color-blindness in the two countries is nearly identical.

Vorauer, Gagnon, and Sasaki, examined the effect that messages with a color-blind ideology had on white Canadians entering one-on-one interactions with Aboriginal Canadians. White Canadians who heard messages emphasizing color-blind ideology were much more likely to be concerned with ensuring the subsequent interaction did not go badly and were more likely to be hostile, uncomfortable, nervous, self-critical, and uncertain. White participants who heard messages emphasizing multicultural ideology, or the valuing of people's differences, asked more positive questions focused on the other person and did not display significant concern for how the interaction would go.

Alternatives

Researchers also offer alternatives to the color-blindness discourse. Reason and Evans call for people to become "racially cognizant", that is they need to acknowledge the role that race plays in their everyday lives. Being racially cognizant also demands a continuous examination and reinterpretation of race and how it affects our lives. It is also important to balance looking at a person as an individual and acknowledging the role their membership to a social group plays in their daily lives.

Researcher Jennifer Simpson proposed that "in setting aside color blindness, Whites must learn to see, accept, and experience their lives as raced and to explore the possibility that some of the good, ease, or rewards they have experienced have not been solely the result of hard work and just effort but of a system biased in their favor." This conscious exploration of whiteness as a racial and social identity and the acknowledgment of the role of whiteness is connected to modern whiteness studies. However, the field of whiteness studies has been criticized for its focus on reprimanding the white population, whereas similar fields such as Black studies, Women's studies, and Chicano Studies celebrate the contributions of the eponymous group.

In a recent publication of the academic journal Communication Theory, Jennifer Simpson proposed a "more productive dialogue about race". New dialogue must take a more complex look at race, openly looking at all different perspectives on race. As dialogue is a means of empowerment, it should take into account how all experiences contribute to our understanding, particularly those experiences very different from our own. Simpson believes that whites must be willing to openly engage with people of color in discussing the ongoing effects of racism today. However, this requires white people to participate in "communicative behavior that may threaten simultaneously their sense of self and their material power in the social order".

In education
A multisite case study of Atlantic State University, a primarily white institution, and Mid-Atlantic State University, a historically black college, explored color-blind ideologies among the institutions’ white faculty members at the undergraduate and graduate level. In interviews with white faculty members at both institutions, researchers found the faculty often engaged with students from a color-blind perspective. Use of color-blind language by avoiding racial terms but instead implying them "allowed white faculty members to describe their students [of color] as academically inferior, less prepared, and less interested in pursuing research and graduate studies while potentially ignoring structural causes" of inequity. The study concludes that color-blind ideology held by school faculty can reduce a student of color's perception of their academic abilities and potential to achieve success in STEM disciplines and in graduate school.

A case study of a suburban, mixed-race high school examined the trend toward color-blind ideology in schools among white faculty. The study's implications included that white school faculty's color-blind ideology often masks their fears of being accused of racism and prevents a deeper examination of race.

Case studies of three large school districts, (Boston, Massachusetts; Wake County, North Carolina; and Jefferson County, Louisville) found that the districts’ race-neutral, or color-blind, policies to combat school segregation may actually be associated with an increase in segregation in schools, due to the policies' tendency to "reframe privilege as common sense" while ignoring the structural inequalities of students outside that privileged framework.

See also
 Gender-blind
 Post-racial America
 Constitutional colorblindness
 White privilege
 Whiteness theory
 Equalized odds

References

Further reading

 
 
 
 
 
 
 
  Full text
  Examines racial and ethnic considerations in theatrical role casting.

External links

 

 Standing Up for Playwrights and Against ‘Colorblind’ Casting American Theatre, Theatre Communications Group

Politics and race in the United States
Affirmative action in the United States
Race in the United States